The following is the orders, decorations, and medals given by Sultan of Kelantan. When applicable, post-nominal letters and non-hereditary titles are indicated.

Order of precedence for the wearing of order insignias, decorations, and medals  
Precedence:
{|
|-
| 1. || width=350px | Darjah Kerabat Yang Amat Di-Hormati (Al-Yunusi)  || width=100px| D.K. || align=center| -- 
|-
| 2. || Darjah Seri Paduka Mahkota Kelantan (Al-Muhammadi I) || S.P.M.K. || align=center | Dato|-
| 3. || Darjah Seri Paduka Jiwa Mahkota Kelantan (Al-Ismaili I) || S.J.M.K. || align=center | Dato|-
| 4. || Darjah Seri Paduka Kesateria Mahkota Kelantan (Al-Yahyawi I) || S.P.K.K. || align=center | Dato|-
| 5. || Darjah Seri Paduka Setia Mahkota Kelantan (Al-Ibrahimi I) || S.P.S.K. || align=center | Dato'''
|-
| 6. || Darjah Seri Paduka Jasa Mahkota Kelantan (Al-Petrawi I) || S.P.J.K. || align=center | Dato
|-
| 7. || Darjah Pahlawan Yang Amat Gagah Perkasa || P.Y.G.P. || align=center| --  
|-
| 8. || Darjah Dato' Paduka Mahkota Kelantan (Al-Muhammadi II) || D.P.M.K. || align=center | Dato’|-
| 9. || Darjah Dato' Paduka Jiwa Mahkota Kelantan (Al-Ismaili II) || D.J.M.K. || align=center | Dato’|-
| 10. || Darjah Dato' Paduka Kesateria Mahkota Kelantan (Al-Yahyawi II) || D.P.K.K. || align=center | Dato’|-
| 11. || Darjah Dato' Paduka Setia Mahkota Kelantan (Al-Ibrahimi II) || D.P.S.K. || align=center | Dato’|-
| 12. || Darjah Dato' Paduka Jasa Mahkota Kelantan (Al-Petrawi II) || D.P.J.K. || align=center | Dato’|-
| 13. || Paduka Mahkota Kelantan (Al-Muhammadi III) || P.M.K. || align=center| --  
|-
| 14. || Setia Jiwa Mahkota Kelantan (Al-Ismaili III) || J.M.K. || align=center| --  
|-
| 15. || Paduka Kesateria Mahkota Kelantan (Al-Yahyawi III) || P.K.K. || align=center| --  
|-
| 16. || Paduka Setia Mahkota Kelantan (Al-Ibrahimi III) || P.S.K. || align=center| --  
|-
| 17. || Paduka Jasa Mahkota Kelantan (Al-Petrawi III) || P.J.K. || align=center| --  
|-
| 18. || Bentara Setia Mahkota Kelantan (Al-Ibrahimi IV) || B.S.K. || align=center| --  
|-
| 19. || Bentara Jasa Mahkota Kelantan (Al-Petrawi IV) || B.J.K. || align=center| --  
|-
| 20. || Ahli Setia Mahkota Kelantan (Al-Ibrahimi V) || A.S.K. || align=center| --  
|-
| 21. || Ahli Jasa Mahkota Kelantan (Al-Petrawi V) || A.J.K. || align=center| --  
|-
| 22. || Seri Mahkota Kelantan || S.M.K. || align=center| --  
|-
| 23. || Seri Kelantan || S.K. || align=center| --  
|-
| 24. || Ahli Kelantan || A.K. || align=center| --  
|-
| 25. || Jaksa Pendamai || J.P. || align=center| --  
|-
| 26. || Pingat Bakti || P.B. || align=center| --  
|-
| 27. || Pingat Setia Mahkota Kelantan || P.S. || align=center| --  
|-
| 28. || Pingat Taat || P.T. || align=center| --  
|-
| 29. || Pingat Perangai Baik || P.P.B. || align=center| --  
|}

 Orders, decorations, and medals 

The Most Esteemed Royal Family Order of Kelantan or the Star of Yunus - Darjah Kerabat Yang Amat Dihormati (Bintang al-Yunusi)Founded by Sultan Muhammad IV on 9 August 1916.
Awarded in a single class (D.K.), limited to 25 recipients at any one time and reserved for members of the royal families and state dignitaries.
The sash of the order is worn from the left shoulder to the right hip.

The Most Illustrious Order of the Crown of Kelantan, or the Star of Muhammad - Darjah Kebesaran Mahkota Kelantan Yang Amat Mulia (Bintang al-Muhammadi)Founded by Sultan Muhammad IV in honour of Sultan Muhammad I on 9 August 1916.
Awarded in three classes :
1. Knight Grand Commander or Dato’ Paduka - limited to 40 recipients - S.P.M.K.
2. Knight Commander or Dato’ Paduka - limited to 60 recipients - D.P.M.K.
3. Commander or Paduka - P.M.K.see also The Crown of Kelantan Decoration - Sri Mahkota Kelantan (S.M.K.)see also The Sri Kelantan Decoration - Sri Kelantan (S.K.)The Most Illustrious Order of the Life of the Crown of Kelantan or the Star of Ismail - Darjah Kebesaran Jiwa Mahkota Kelantan Yang Amat Mulia (Bintang al-Ismaili)Founded by Sultan Ismail on 21 July 1925.
Awarded in three classes :
1. Knight Grand Commander or Dato’ Paduka - limited to 50 recipients - S.J.M.K.
2. Knight Commander or Dato’ Paduka - limited to 75 recipients - D.J.M.K.
3. Companion or Setia - J.M.K.see also The Ahli Kelantan Decoration''' - Ahli Kelantan (A.K.)The Most Valiant Order of the Noble Crown of Kelantan or the Star of Yahya - Darjah Kebesaran Kesateria Mahkota Kelantan Yang Amat Perkasa (Bintang al-Yahyawi)
Founded by Sultan Ismail II Petra on 29 March 1988.
Awarded in three classes :
1. Knight Grand Commander or Dato’ Paduka - limited to 40 recipients - S.P.K.K.
2. Knight Commander or Dato’ Paduka - limited to 60 recipients - D.P.K.K.
3. Commander or Paduka - P.K.K.The Most Distinguished Order of the Loyalty to the Crown of Kelantan or the Star of Ibrahim - Darjah Kebesaran Setia Mahkota Kelantan Yang Amat Terbilang  (Bintang al-Ibrahimi)
Founded by Sultan Yahya Petra on 10 December 1967.
Awarded in five classes :
1. Knight Grand Commander or Dato’ Paduka - limited to 50 recipients - S.P.S.K.
2. Knight Commander or Dato’ Paduka - limited to 75 recipients - D.P.S.K.
3. Commander or Paduka - P.S.K.
4. Officer or Bentara - B.S.K.
5. Member or Ahli - A.S.K.
and a medal of merit (Pingat Setia Mahkota Kelantan) - P.S.The Most Loyal Order of the Services to the Crown of Kelantan or the Star of Petra - Darjah Kebesaran Jasa Mahkota Kelantan (Bintang al-Petrawi)
Founded by Sultan Muhammad V on 15 May 2016.
Awarded in five classes :
1. Knight Grand Commander or Dato’ Paduka - S.P.J.K.
2. Knight Commander or Dato’ Paduka - D.P.J.K.
3. Commander or Paduka - P.J.K.
4. Officer or Bentara - B.J.K.
5. Member or Ahli - A.J.K.The Order of the Most Distinguished and Most Valiant Warrior - Darjah Pahlawan Yang Amat Gagah Perkasa Yang Amat Mulia
Founded by Sultan Muhammad IV on 9 August 1919 as a reward for individual acts of supreme gallantry and valour.
Awarded in one class (P.Y.G.P.)Crown of Kelantan Decoration - Sri Mahkota Kelantan
Instituted by Sultan Muhammad IV in 1916 as a reward for those whose civil services do not qualify for the ordinary classes of the Order of the Crown of Kelantan.
Awarded in a single class (S.M.K.)
In reality this decoration functions as the fourth class of the Order of the Crown of Kelantan.Sri Kelantan Decoration - Sri Kelantan
Instituted by Sultan Muhammad IV in 1916 as a reward for those whose services do not qualify for the ordinary classes of the Order of the Crown of Kelantan.
Awarded in a single class (S.K.)
Originally a military decoration which now functions essentially as the fifth class of the Order of the Crown of Kelantan.Ahli Kelantan Decoration - Ahli Kelantan
Instituted by Sultan Ismail in 1925 as a reward for those whose services do not qualify for the ordinary classes of the Order of the Life of the Crown of Kelantan.
Awarded in a single class (A.K.)
In reality this decoration functions as the fourth class of the Order of the Life of the Crown of Kelantan.Meritorious Service Medal - Pingat Bakti
Instituted by Sultan Ismail in 1925 as a reward for general service and awarded principally to military officers.
Awarded in a single class, a silver medal (P.B.)Medal of Loyalty to the Crown of Kelantan - Pingat Setia Mahkota Kelantan
Instituted by Sultan Yahya Petra in 1967 as a reward for civil servants.
Awarded in a single class, a silver medal (P.S.)
In reality this decoration functions as the sixth class of the Order of the Loyalty to the Crown of Kelantan.Loyal Service Medal - Pingat Taat
Instituted by Sultan Ismail in 1925 as a reward for long service awarded principally to military personnel.
Awarded in a single class, a silver medal (P.T.)Good Conduct Medal - Pingat Perangai Baik
Instituted by Sultan Ismail in 1939 to reward long service and good conduct in government service.
Awarded in a single class, a silver medal (P.P.B.)State Council Opening Commemorative Medal 1939 - Pingat Peringatan Pembukaan Dewan Tinggi 1939
Instituted by Sultan Muhammad IV to commemorate the opening of the inauguration of the first Kelantan State Council in 1939.
Awarded in a single class, a silver medal (P.P.M.)Sultan Ibrahim Coronation Medal - Pingat Kemahkotaan Sultan Ibrahim
Instituted by Sultan Ibrahim to commemorate his Coronation on 25 October 1944.
Awarded in a single class, a silver medal.Sultan Yahya Petra Coronation Medal - Pingat Kemahkotaan Sultan Yahya Petra
Instituted by Sultan Yahya Petra on 17 July 1961 to commemorate his Coronation.
Awarded in two classes :
1. Gold - for rulers
2. Silver - for ordinary recipients.Sultan Ismail Petra Coronation Medal - Pingat Kemahkotaan Sultan Ismail Petra
Instituted by Sultan Ismail II to commemorate his Coronation on 30 March 1980.
Awarded in two classes :
1. Gold - for rulers
2. Silver - for ordinary recipients.Silver Jubilee Medal''' - Pingat Jubli Perak''
Instituted by Sultan Ismail II to commemorate his Silver Jubilee on 30 March 2004.
Awarded in a single class, a silver medal (P.J.P.)

See also 

Orders, decorations, and medals of the Malaysian states and federal territories#Kelantan
List of post-nominal letters (Kelantan)

References 

 
Kelantan